Crepaja is a village in Serbia. It is situated in the Kovačica municipality, in the South Banat District, Vojvodina province. The village has a Serb ethnic majority (88.15%) and its population numbering 4,855 people (2002 census).

Historical population

1961: 5,516
1971: 5,289
1981: 5,369
1991: 5,128
2002: 4,855

References

Slobodan Ćurčić, Broj stanovnika Vojvodine, Novi Sad, 1996.

See also
List of places in Serbia
List of cities, towns and villages in Vojvodina

Populated places in Serbian Banat
Populated places in South Banat District
Kovačica